Crepis pygmaea (commonly pygmy hawksbeard) is a species of flowering plant in the genus Crepis in the family Asteraceae.

Description

Vegetative features
The stems are arching and ascending, mostly branched, one or more heads, white tomentose or glabrous, often tinged with purple. The plant has few leaves. The above-ground parts of the plant are hairy.

The lower leaves are heart-shaped and usually long-stemmed. The upper leaves are irregularly pinnate with a very large end section and small side sections. The underside of the leaf is often tinged with purple.

Generative traits
The flowering period extends from July to August.

The chromosome number is 2n = 8 or 12.

Occurrence
The pygmy hawksbeard occurs in the Pyrenees and the western Alps, in Spain, Andorra, France, Switzerland, and Austria.

Further reading

References

pygmaea
Flora of Southwestern Europe
Flora of Austria
Flora of Switzerland
Taxa named by Carl Linnaeus